Maruja Pachón (born December 9, 1948) is a Colombia kidnap victim and former Minister for Education.

Biography
Pachón was born in New York. She married Alberto Villamizar and as result she and her sister in law, Beatriz Villamizar de Guerrero, were kidnapped by Pablo Escobar on 7 November 1990. She may have been chosen because her sister was the widow of the Presidential candidate Luis Carlos Galán who had been assassinated in August 1989 by hit men hired by the drug cartels. Escobar eventually kidnapped further victims in order that he might persuade the Government of President César Gaviria to rethink their drugs policy. She was released in May 1991. She and her husband feature strongly in News of a Kidnapping which was written by Gabriel Garcia Marquez and the documents the kidnappings.

She was offered  the position of Minister for Education by President César Gaviria in 1993.

References

1948 births
Living people
People from Cúcuta
Colombian journalists
Colombian women journalists